Raffaele Lombardo ; (born 29 October 1950, in Catania) is an Italian politician who was President of Sicily and former Member of the European Parliament for Islands with the Movement for the Autonomies and has sat on the European Parliament's Committee on Civil Liberties, Justice and Home Affairs.

In 2005, he split off from the Union of Christian and Centre Democrats (UDC) to form the autonomist Sicilian-based Movement for Autonomy, after he had accused the UDC leadership of being too centralist. In 2008, he was elected as President of Sicily, obtaining over 65% of the regional votes and defeating Anna Finocchiaro of the Democratic Party. On 31 July 2012, he resigned from the presidency because he was under investigation for external contribution with mafia and pork-barrelling, as it appears that he had relationships with some figure of Cosa Nostra. Nevertheless, in the following elections he managed to have his 23 years old son Toti elected in the Sicilian Regional Assembly. On 19 February 2014, he was sentenced to six years and eight months in prison for Mafia association, but in 2022 he was acquitted in the second appeal trial.

Education
 1968: Secondary school-leaving certificate in classical subjects
 Graduate in medicine and surgery
 Specialisation in forensic psychiatry
 Private practice
 1977: Provincial Secretary of the Catania Youth DC
 Regional Secretary of the Centre Democrats (CCD) for Sicily
 Member of Catania Municipal Council for eight years
 Several terms as Catania Municipal Councillor with responsibility for budget, planning, health, cultural heritage, youth issues, taxation

Career

 1986-1994: Member of the Sicilian Regional Assembly with Christian Democracy
 1991-1992: Assessor for Local Authorities of the Sicilian Regional Executive (resigned for enquiries)
 1999-2008: Member of the European Parliament with CCD
 2003-2008: President of the Province of Catania with UDC
 2008-2012: President of Sicily with MPA

References

External links
 Raffaele Lombardo's official website
 European Parliament biography of Raffaele Lombardo
 

1950 births
Living people
Presidents of Sicily
Politicians from Catania
MEPs for Italy 2004–2009
Movement for the Autonomies MEPs
Movement for the Autonomies politicians
MEPs for Italy 1999–2004
Christian Democratic Centre politicians
Members of the Sicilian Regional Assembly
Presidents of the Province of Catania
Heads of government who were later imprisoned
Italian politicians convicted of crimes
Criminals from Sicily